The following article presents a summary of the 2015 football (soccer) season in Brazil, which iwas the 114th season of competitive football in the country.

Campeonato Brasileiro Série A

The 2015 Campeonato Brasileiro Série A started on May 9, 2015, and concluded on December 6, 2015.

Atlético Mineiro
Atlético Paranaense
Avaí
Chapecoense
Corinthians
Coritiba
Cruzeiro
Figueirense
Flamengo
Fluminense
Goiás
Grêmio
Internacional
Joinville
Palmeiras
Ponte Preta
Santos
São Paulo
Sport
Vasco da Gama

Corinthians won the Campeonato Brasileiro Série A.

Relegation
The four worst placed teams, which are Avaí, Vasco da Gama, Goiás and Joinville, were relegated to the following year's second level.

Campeonato Brasileiro Série B

The 2015 Campeonato Brasileiro Série B started on May 8, 2015, and concluded on November 28, 2015.

ABC
América-MG
Atlético Goianiense
Bahia
Boa Esporte
Botafogo
Bragantino
Ceará
CRB
Criciúma
Luverdense
Macaé
Mogi Mirim
Náutico
Oeste
Paraná
Paysandu
Sampaio Corrêa
Santa Cruz
Vitória

Botafogo won the Campeonato Brasileiro Série B.

Promotion
The four best placed teams, which are Botafogo, Santa Cruz, Vitória and América-MG, were promoted to the following year's first level.

Relegation
The four worst placed teams, which are Macaé, ABC, Boa Esporte and Mogi Mirim, were relegated to the following year's third level.

Campeonato Brasileiro Série C

The 2015 Campeonato Brasileiro Série C started on May 16, 2015, and concluded on November 21, 2015.

Águia de Marabá
América-RN
ASA de Arapiraca
Botafogo-PB
Brasil de Pelotas
Caxias
Confiança
Cuiabá
Fortaleza
Guarani
Guaratinguetá
Icasa
Juventude
Londrina
Madureira
Portuguesa
Salgueiro
Tombense
Tupi
Vila Nova

The Campeonato Brasileiro Série C final was played between Londrina and Vila Nova.

Vila Nova won the league after beating Londrina by aggregate score of 4–2.

Promotion
The four best placed teams, which are Vila Nova, Londrina, Tupi and Brasil de Pelotas, were promoted to the following year's second level.

Relegation
The four worst placed teams, which are Águia de Marabá, Madureira, Caxias and Icasa, were relegated to the following year's fourth level.

Campeonato Brasileiro Série D

The 2015 Campeonato Brasileiro Série D started on July 12, 2015, and concluded on November 14, 2015.

Aparecidense
Botafogo-SP
Caldense
Campinense
Central
CEOV
Colo Colo
Comercial-MS
Coruripe
CRAC
Duque de Caxias
Estanciano
Foz do Iguaçu
Gama
Globo
Goianésia
Guarani de Juazeiro
Imperatriz
Inter de Lages
Lajeadense
Metropolitano
Nacional
Náutico-RR
Operário Ferroviário
Palmas
Red Bull Brasil
Remo
Resende
Rio Branco
Rio Branco-ES
Ríver
Santos-AP
São Caetano
Serra Talhada
Serrano
Treze
Vilhena
Villa Nova
Volta Redonda
Ypiranga de Erechim

The Campeonato Brasileiro Série D final was played between Botafogo-SP and Ríver-PI.

Botafogo-SP won the league after beating Ríver by aggregate score of 3–2.

Promotion
The four best placed teams, which are Botafogo-SP, Ríver, Remo and Ypiranga de Erechim, were promoted to the following year's third level.

Domestic cups

Copa do Brasil

The 2015 Copa do Brasil started on February 8, 2015, and concluded on December 2, 2015. The Copa do Brasil final was played between Palmeiras and Santos.

Palmeiras won the cup after beating Santos 4–3 on penalties.

Copa do Nordeste

The competition featured 20 clubs from the Northeastern region, including for the first time the Maranhão and Piauí champions and runners-up. Ceará beat Bahia in the final with a 3–1 aggregate score.

Copa Verde

The competition featured 16 clubs from the North and Central-West regions, including the Espírito Santo champions. Mato Grosso's team Cuiabá defeated Pará's team Remo 6–5 on aggregate score.

State championship champions

Youth competition champions

(1) The Copa Nacional do Espírito Santo Sub-17, between 2008 and 2012, was named Copa Brasil Sub-17. The similar named Copa do Brasil Sub-17 is organized by the Brazilian Football Confederation and it was first played in 2013.

Other competition champions

Brazilian clubs in international competitions

Brazil national team
The following table lists all the games played by the Brazilian national team in official competitions and friendly matches during 2015.

Friendlies

Copa América

2018 FIFA World Cup qualification

Women

National team 
The following table lists all the games played by the Brazil women's national football team in official competitions and friendly matches during 2015.

Friendlies

Algarve Cup

FIFA Women's World Cup

Pan American Games

Torneio Internacional Feminino 

The Brazil women's national football team competed in the following competitions in 2015:

Campeonato Brasileiro de Futebol Feminino

The 2015 Campeonato Brasileiro de Futebol Feminino started on September 7, 2015, and concluded on December 6, 2015.  The Campeonato Brasileiro de Futebol Feminino final was played between Rio Preto and São José.

Rio Preto won the league by aggregate score of 2–1.

Copa do Brasil de Futebol Feminino

The 2015 Copa do Brasil de Futebol Feminino started on February 4, 2015, and concluded on April 8, 2015.

Kindermann won the cup 4–1 on points.

Domestic competition champions

Brazilian clubs in international competitions

Notes

References

 Brazilian competitions at RSSSF

 
Seasons in Brazilian football